Kumudini Lakhia (born 17 May 1930) is an Indian Kathak dancer and choreographer based in Ahmedabad, Gujarat, where she founded Kadamb School of Dance and Music, an institute of Indian dance and music in 1967.

A pioneer in contemporary Kathak dance, she is credited for moving away from the solo form of Kathak starting in the 1960s, by turning it into a group spectacle, and also innovations like taking away traditional stories and adding contemporary storylines into Kathak repertoire.

Early life and education
Lakhia started her Kathak training with Sohanlal from the Bikaner Gharana at age seven. This was followed by Ashiq Hussain of Benaras Gharana and Sunder Prasad of the Jaipur school. Encouraged by her mother, Leela, herself a classical singer, she was sent to further her training under the tutelage of Radheylal Misra, himself a disciple of Jai Lal. As a result, she completed her schooling in Lahore and college in Allahabad.

Career
She started her career dancing with Ram Gopal as he toured the West, bringing Indian dance to the eyes of people abroad for the first time, and then became a dancer and choreographer in her own right. She learned first from various gurus of Jaipur gharana, and then from Shambhu Maharaj.

She is particularly known for her multi-person choreographies. Some of her most famous choreographies include Dhabkar (Pulse), Yugal (The Duet), and Atah Kim (Where Now?), which she performed at the annual Kathak Mahotsav in Delhi in 1980. She was also a choreographer in the Hindi film, Umrao Jaan (1981), along with Gopi Krishna.

She is a guru to many disciples, including Kathak dancers Aditi Mangaldas, Vaishali Trivedi, Sandhya Desai, Daksha Sheth, Maulik Shah, Ishira Parikh,  Prashant Shah, Urja Thakore and Parul Shah amongst others .

Personal life
She married Rajnikant Lakhia, who was studying law at the Lincolns Inn and was a violinist with the Ram Gopal company and moved to Ahmedabad in 1960. 
She has a son Shriraj and a daughter Maitreyi.

She was the Cornell Visiting Professor at Swarthmore College for the 2012–2013 academic year.

Choreographies
"Variation in Thumri" (1969)
"Venu Nad" (1970)
"Bhajan" (1985)
"Hori" (1970)
"Kolaahal" (1971)
"Duvidha" (1971)
"Dhabkar" (1973)
"Yugal" (1976)
"Umrao Jaan" (1981)
"Atah Kim" (1982)
"Okha Haran" (1990)
"Hun-Nari" (1993)
"Golden Chains" (for Neena Gupt, London)
"Sam Samvedan" (1993)
"Samanvay" (2003)
"Bhav Krida" (1999)
"Feathered Cloth – Hagoromo" (2006)
"Mushti" (2005)

Awards and honors
Padma Shri by the Government of India in 1987
Padma Bhushan in 2010
Sangeet Natak Akademi Award by Sangeet Natak Akademi in 1982 
Kalidas Samman for the year 2002-03
Sangeet Natak Akademi Tagore Ratna by Sangeet Natak Akademi in 2011
Guru Gopinath Desiya Natya Puraskaram (2021) by Government of Kerala

References

Further reading
Movement in Stills: The Dance And Life of Kumudini Lakhia by Reena Shah
Choreography in the Indian Context by Kumudini Lakhia, (Keynote address Feb 2002)

External links
Kadamb website
Kumudini Lakhia Interview nartaki.com

Kathak exponents
Performers of Indian classical dance
Indian classical choreographers
1930 births
Living people
Artists from Ahmedabad
Teachers of Indian classical dance
Recipients of the Padma Shri in arts
Recipients of the Padma Bhushan in arts
Recipients of the Sangeet Natak Akademi Award
Indian women choreographers
Indian choreographers
Women educators from Gujarat
Educators from Gujarat
Indian dance teachers
Indian female classical dancers
20th-century Indian dancers
Dancers from Gujarat
20th-century Indian educators
20th-century Indian women artists
Women musicians from Gujarat
20th-century women educators